Óró – A Live Session is a music album by Irish musician Máire Brennan, now known as Moya Brennan. Just before the start of the German tour, Moya and her band recorded a "live session" album to have available for fans on the tour. She's tried to recreate some of the live feel with the band in the studio covering many of the songs she plays (and was about to play) in concert. The album will become more widely available subsequently, but originally was released in 2005.

Personnel

Band
 Moya Brennan – Vocals, Harp, Keyboards
 The Moya Brennan Band
 Sinéad Madden – Fiddle, Vocals
 Sam Jackson – Keyboards
 Éamonn Galldubh – Uilleann pipes, Flutes, Whistles
 Cormac de Barra – Harp, Vocals
 Fionán de Barra – Acoustic Guitars, Vocals
 Yoshinobu Izumi – Electric Guitars, Vocals, Bass
 Paul Byrne – Drums, Percussion

Track listing
"An tÚll"
"Buachaill Ón Éirne"
"Alistair McColla"
"Óró"
"Ageless Messenger"
"Three instrumentals (Medley)"
"Mary of the Gaels"
"Roundabout"
"Father Francis Cameroon"
"Perfect Time"
"A Mhuirnín Ó"
"Éirigh Suas A Stóirín"
"Dúlamán"
"Against the Wind"

Release details
2005, Germany, Gola GOL001 (CD)

External links
 This album at Northern Skyline

Moya Brennan albums
2005 live albums